Pakpattan Hydropower Plant is a small hydro, low head project of 4.2 metres, located in the Pakpattan District on the Upper Chenab Canal, in Punjab Province, Pakistan. It is approximately 245 km from the provincial capital of Lahore in the Islamic Republic of Pakistan.

The total electricity generation capacity of the Pakpattan Hydropower Plant is 2.82 MW.

Financing
Asian Development Bank (ADB) provided a loan of US$28.435 million from July 2009 onwards to complete the  works on the project. The total cost of the project is estimated to be PKR 3.3 billion.

Construction
Power House is in commercial operation since 25 March 2017. The Chinese firm handed over the Project to PPDCL on 8 March 2017.

Dam:
Type: Small hydro
Design Discharge: 2800 Cusecs
Design Head: 4.2 m.

See also 

 List of dams and reservoirs in Pakistan
 List of power stations in Pakistan
 Marala Hydropower Project
 Chianwali Dam
 Deg Outfall  Dam
 Duber Khwar hydropower project

References 

Dams completed in 2012
Energy infrastructure completed in 2012
Dams in Pakistan
Hydroelectric power stations in Pakistan
Dams in the Indus River basin
Run-of-the-river power stations